Lycée Dumont d'Urville may refer to the following French schools:
Lycée Dumont d'Urville (Caen) in Caen
Lycée Dumont d'Urville (Maurepas, Yvelines)
 in Toulon